Nursling railway station served the village of Nursling near Southampton, England.

History
The Andover and Redbridge Railway was authorised in 1858 and opened in 1865, by which time it had been absorbed by the London and South Western Railway (LSWR), this occurring in 1863. The station at Nursling was opened by the LSWR on 19 November 1882. Becoming part of the Southern Railway during the Grouping of 1923, the station passed to the Southern Region of British Railways on nationalisation in 1948. It was closed by the British Transport Commission on 16 September 1957.

The site today

The station house is in use as a private residence, although the platforms have been demolished. Trains still pass the site on the Wessex Main Line.

References

Sources
 
 
 
 Bray, Nigel (2004). Andover to Redbridge: The Sprat and Winkle Line. KRB Publications.

External links
 Nursling station on navigable 1945 O. S. map
 Andover and Redbridge Railway

Disused railway stations in Hampshire
Former London and South Western Railway stations
Railway stations in Great Britain opened in 1882
Railway stations in Great Britain closed in 1957